The Peace of Cremona was concluded in 1270 between the Republic of Genoa and the Republic of Venice, ending the War of Saint Sabas. The peace was the result of pressure by France, the Pope, and Sicily, who moved the reluctant warring republics to conclude a five-year truce.

References

Sources
 
 

1270 in Europe
Cremona 1270
Cremona
Cremona 1270
Cremona 1270
Cremona 1270
War of Saint Sabas